The term Class D may refer to:

 Class D (baseball), a defunct class in minor league baseball in North America
 Class-D amplifier or switching amplifier
 Class D fire extinguisher
 Class D league, a classification of minor league baseball from 1902 to 1962
 Class D star, a stellar classification 
 Class D, IP addresses on a classful network
 Class D, an airspace class as defined by the ICAO
 Class D, a type of Driver's license in the United States
 Class D, a North American broadcast station class
 Class-D, a type of character in the video game SCP – Containment Breach

See also
 D class (disambiguation)
 D (disambiguation)